The Tricornenses of Tricornum (modern Ritopek) were a Romanized Thraco-Celtic artificially created community by the Romans that replaced the Celtic Celegeri. The inhabitants of Tricornum were Celtic and Thracian, attested by epigraphic sources. After 6 AD, the Tricornenses were one of the four units of Upper Moesia alongside the Dardani, Moesi and Picenses. The ceremonial parade armour found at Ritopek belonged to a Tricornian soldier of Legio VII Claudia, dating to AD 258.

See also
List of Celtic tribes
List of ancient tribes in Illyria

References

Ancient tribes in Serbia
Celtic tribes of Illyria